Boeica is a genus of flowering plants belonging to the family Gesneriaceae.

Its native range is Tropical Asia.

Species:

Boeica brachyandra 
Boeica clarkei 
Boeica ferruginea 
Boeica filiformis 
Boeica fulva 
Boeica glandulosa 
Boeica griffithii 
Boeica guileana 
Boeica hirsuta 
Boeica konchurangensis 
Boeica multinervia 
Boeica nutans 
Boeica ornithocephalantha 
Boeica porosa 
Boeica stolonifera 
Boeica yunnanensis

References

Didymocarpoideae
Gesneriaceae genera